Phat Tuesdays: The Era of Hip Hop Comedy is an American television documentary series about the 1990s comedy showcase hosted and created by Guy Torry. It premiered on Amazon Prime Video on February 4, 2022.

Summary
The series tells the story of Phat Tuesdays at The Comedy Store in Los Angeles. The event was founded and hosted by comedian Guy Torry from 1995 to 2005, to spotlight Black performers, and helped launch the careers of comedians including Steve Harvey, Chris Rock, and Martin Lawrence. It includes interviews with comedians and celebrities who were there, and previously unreleased footage of comedy sets.  All three episodes are directed by Reginald Hudlin.

Cast

 Guy Torry
 Regina King
 Tiffany Haddish
 Chris Tucker
 Anthony Anderson
 J. B. Smoove
 Snoop Dogg
 Steve Harvey
 Dave Chappelle
 Lil Rel Howery
 Pauly Shore
 Nick Cannon
 Cedric the Entertainer
 Tommy Davidson
 Bob Saget
 Marsha Warfield
 Jay Pharoah

Episodes

Release
The official trailer was released on January 20, 2022. The series premiered on Prime Video on February 4, 2022.

References

External links
 

2022 American television series debuts
2022 American television series endings
2020s American documentary television series
American stand-up comedy television series
English-language television shows
Amazon Prime Video original programming
Television series by Amazon Studios
Television series by Original Productions